The LG Secret (a.k.a. LG KF750) is a 3G slider-style mobile phone manufactured by LG Electronics. It is the third phone in LG's "Black Label Series", following the LG Chocolate and LG Shine. It was released on May 3, 2008 in Europe. 
It has a 5.0-megapixel camera and Neon touch navigation, and is notable for incorporating these in a slim slider form design.

Design
The phone is black, with the battery cover made of carbon fiber. The front display is shielded with tempered glass. The top of the phone is covered with synthetic leather. The phone also features mechanical Send, End and Cancel buttons, addressing a complaint that some users had with previous LG phones. Although the device is marketed as a fashion style mobile, its hardware is on par with many feature mobiles on the market at the time of launch.

Features
At the time of its release, the phone was the world's slimmest 5.0-megapixel camera phone. It records video in VGA @ 30fps and QVGA @ 120fps and "time lapse videos". the QVGA videos are recorded in 120fps and then saved at 15fps. this enables slow motion videos. The videos are recorded with divx encoding which balances quality with file size.

It comes with a LED flash, which despite not being a xenon flash, functions well in dim lighting for objects up to 2 meters away. the phone also has support for divx videos. LG Secret comes with an accelerometer, which auto-adjusts the phone's display based on the orientation of the phone. The phone also comes with accelorometer games. The LG Secret  comes with Auto Luminance Control which automatically adjusts screen brightness according to ambient brightness.

Price
The phone was sold in the UK market at launch for £339.95.

See also
LG Viewty
LG Vu
LG Renoir
LG Cookie
LG Voyager
LG KS360

References

External links 
  Official website of LG Secret (LG KF750)
  LG Mobile Phone Page (LG KF750)
  LG Secrets Review 

KF750
Mobile phones introduced in 2008